The IEEE Transactions on Molecular, Biological and Multi-Scale Communications is a quarterly peer-reviewed scientific journal published by the Institute of Electrical and Electronics Engineers IEEE Communications Society covering research on molecular and biological signal processing. It was established in 2015.

The first editor-in-chief was Dr. Urbashi Mitra from University of Southern California from 2015 to 2018. Currently, Dr. Chan-Byoung Chae from Yonsei University, Korea is the editor-in-chief of the journal.

References

External links 
 

Engineering journals
IEEE academic journals
Quarterly journals
Publications established in 2015
English-language journals